Masen is a village in Iran.

Masen may also refer to:
 Masen, the acronym for the Moroccan Agency for Sustainable Energy
 Masen Davis (born 1971), an American transgender rights activist

See also
 Mesen, Iran (disambiguation)